Zack Golditch (born February 22, 1995) is a former American football guard. He played college football at Colorado State.

College career
Golditch was a member of the Colorado State Rams football team for five seasons, redshirting his freshman season. Golditch started 38 games over the next four seasons for the Rams and was named first-team All-Mountain West as a senior.

Professional career

Los Angeles Chargers
Golditch signed with the Los Angeles Chargers as an undrafted free agent on April 30, 2018. He was waived by the team at the end of the preseason.

San Francisco 49ers
Golditch was signed to the San Francisco 49ers practice squad on September 2, 2018. He was released by the 49ers on October 16, 2018.

Indianapolis Colts
Golditch was signed to the Indianapolis practice squad on October 18, 2018.

Arizona Cardinals
Golditch was signed to the Arizona Cardinals active roster off the Colts practice squad on November 5, 2018. He made his NFL debut on November 25, 2018 against the Los Angeles Chargers. He was waived on May 9, 2019.

Kansas City Chiefs
On May 10, 2019, Golditch was claimed off waivers by the Kansas City Chiefs. Golditch was waived by the Chiefs during final roster cuts on August 31, 2019.

Golditch was selected by the Tampa Bay Vipers in the 5th phase of the 2020 XFL Draft. After the XFL folded, he ultimately decided to retire.

Personal life
When he was a junior in high school, Golditch was wounded in the 2012 Aurora, Colorado shooting. He was not in the same theater room of the shooting. After retiring from football Golditch became a firefighter with South Metro Fire Rescue.

References

External links
Colorado State Rams bio

Living people
1995 births
Sportspeople from Aurora, Colorado
Players of American football from Colorado
American football offensive guards
Colorado State Rams football players
Los Angeles Chargers players
San Francisco 49ers players
Indianapolis Colts players
Arizona Cardinals players
Kansas City Chiefs players
American shooting survivors
American firefighters